Live in Paris and Toronto is a two CD live album by Loreena McKennitt, released in 1999. Disc one is a live performance of the studio album The Book of Secrets; disc two features songs from her albums The Visit and The Mask and Mirror.

Track listing
 Disc one
 "Prologue" – 5:00
 "The Mummers' Dance" – 3:54
 "Skellig" – 5:24
 "Marco Polo" – 4:35
 "The Highwayman" – 9:19
 "La Serenissima" – 5:55
 "Night Ride Across the Caucasus" – 6:22
 "Dante's Prayer"  5:25

 Disc two
 "The Mystic's Dream" – 6:29
 "Santiago" – 5:32
 "Bonny Portmore" – 3:50
 "Between the Shadows" – 4:18
 "The Lady of Shalott" – 9:05
 "The Bonny Swans" – 6:33
 "The Old Ways" – 5:03
 "All Souls Night" – 4:13
 "Cymbeline" – 6:27

Personnel
Loreena McKennitt – vocals, piano, accordion, keyboards, harp
Nigel Eaton – hurdy-gurdy
Brian Hughes – guitars, oud, bouzouki, keyboards
Caroline Lavelle – cello
Rick Lazar – percussion
Hugh Marsh – violin
Rob Piltch – guitars, keyboards
Donald Quan – keyboards
Danny Thompson – acoustic bass

Loreena McKennitt albums
1999 live albums
Music of Toronto